Hoseynabad-e Sadat (also Romanized as Ḩoseynābād-e Sādāt; also known as Hosein Abad Rostag and Ḩoseynābād) is a village in Salehan Rural District, in the Central District of Khomeyn County, Markazi Province, Iran. At the 2006 census, its population was 40, in 11 families.

References 

Populated places in Khomeyn County